Igor Tadic is a Serbian-born Swiss footballer who plays for SC Steinhausen.

Honours

Individual
Swiss Cup Top goalscorer: 2011–12

References

1986 births
Living people
Sportspeople from Loznica
Serbian footballers
Swiss men's footballers
Serbian emigrants to Switzerland
Association football forwards
SC Kriens players
FC St. Gallen players
Servette FC players
FC Schaffhausen players
FC Vaduz players
Swiss Super League players
Swiss Challenge League players
Swiss expatriate footballers
Expatriate footballers in Liechtenstein
Swiss expatriate sportspeople in Liechtenstein